Seokchon-dong is a neighbourhood, dong of Songpa-gu, Seoul, South Korea. The current dong name literally means "stone village" in hanja named for the old name, dolmari (돌마리), because the region is to said to have much stone.

Attractions
 Samjeondo Monument
 Seokchon Lake Park

Education
Seoul Seokchon Elementary School is located in Seokchon-dong.

Transportation

See also
Administrative divisions of South Korea
Baekje

References

External links
  Seokchon-dong resident center website
 Songpa-gu map

Neighbourhoods of Songpa District